The Palestinian Broadcasting Corporation (PBC) or Palestine Public Broadcasting Corporation, also known as Palestine TV, was established on 1 July 1994 and is within the jurisdiction of the Palestinian Authority. It has a subsidiary radio station known as the Voice of Palestine and a satellite channel known as Palestinian Satellite Channel. Palestine TV first began broadcasting in 1996 in Gaza. The first head of the PBC was Fatah activist and Arafat loyalist Radwan Abu Ayyash, former head of the Arab Journalists' Association.

The PBC was funded partially by the US government until 1998.

On 19 January 2002, the Israel Defense Forces used explosives to destroy the five-story main building and transmission tower of the PBC in Ramallah claiming retaliation for the killing of six people by a Palestinian gunman linked to Fatah. The Israeli Government later singled out PBC for broadcasting material deemed to be anti-Semitic or that incited violence.

The broadcasting corporation is a former European Broadcasting Union associate member, and was alleged to have held negotiations with the European Broadcasting Union to become a full active members.  However, Palestine is not a member of the required organisations, and thus does not comply with the criteria.

References

External links

Publicly funded broadcasters
Television stations in the State of Palestine
Radio stations in the State of Palestine
Television channels and stations established in 1994
Mass media in Ramallah
State media